Lloyd Montgomery Garmadon is a fictional character in the computer-animated television series Ninjago (previously known as Ninjago: Masters of Spinjitzu) which is produced by The Lego Group. He was created by the original Ninjago screenwriters, Dan and Kevin Hageman, and first appeared in the first season of Ninjago, titled Rise of the Snakes, released in December 2011. A different incarnation of Lloyd also serves as the main protagonist of The Lego Ninjago Movie, released in September 2017. Jillian Michaels voiced Lloyd in the first seven seasons of the television series before being replaced by Sam Vincent from the eighth season onward. Dave Franco voices the character in the film.

In the series, Lloyd develops from a young boy aspiring to become a powerful villain like his father, Lord Garmadon, to his main role as the legendary Green Ninja, a prophesied hero within the lore of the series who is destined to protect the land of Ninjago from the forces of evil. He is also the Elemental Master of Energy, which gives him a range of elemental powers, such as shooting green energy beams at enemies and passively shielding his body.

Lloyd is portrayed as the strongest member and eventual leader of a team of six teenage ninja, which is formed in the pilot season of Ninjago. The original team consists of just four members, and Lloyd joins their team in the first season. In both the series and film, the storyline repeatedly places him in opposition to Lord Garmadon, his father and prophesied enemy. Although many other villains appear in the series, this complicated relationship between father and son is an overarching storyline in the show's portrayal of the battle between good and evil.

From its launch, the Ninjago series achieved continued popularity amongst its target audience, with Lloyd being a consistently popular character. He is depicted in numerous short films, children's books, graphic novels and other media, and has also been repeatedly released in Lego minifigure form as part of the Lego Ninjago sets that coincide with each Ninjago season.

Concept and creation

Development 

In 2009, The Lego Group proposed to make a series about ninja, deciding that there would be four ninja with elemental powers. The Lego Ninjago theme concept originated in the Lego Ninja theme, which was released by Lego in 1998. In 2011, Ninjago: Masters of Spinjitzu was launched and included some of the concepts from the Lego Ninja theme, such as dragons and fortresses, but also combined this with a modern setting. The series was created by Michael Hegner and Tommy Andreasen, two Danish film producers. The character of Lloyd Garmadon was conceived by two screenwriters, Dan and Kevin Hageman following the pilot season. The first sketch depicting Lloyd Garmadon was created in 2010 by co-creator Tommy Andreasen. The Hageman Brothers have stated that "Lloyd" Garmadon was created as a pun on "Lord" Garmadon.

The Ninjago: Masters of Spinjitzu series was animated in Copenhagen, Denmark, by Wil Film ApS for its ten-season run. The production was relocated to WildBrain Studios in Canada with the release of the eleventh season titled Secrets of the Forbidden Spinjitzu and renamed Ninjago. This marked the use of new animation styles, including anime-style 2D animation, as a way to experiment with the storyline and add new creativity to the show. The run-time for the show was also revised from 22 minutes to 11 minutes.

The eighth season titled Sons of Garmadon implemented a new phase for the ninjas' designs, which were now based on the designs of their movie counterparts in The Lego Ninjago Movie. Not only were the character appearances updated, but Lloyd was presented as noticeably older in appearance, which was further illustrated by the introduction of a new voice actor. The design changes aimed to help new fans of the movie transition to the television series.

Voice actors
For seasons one to seven of the Ninjago series, Lloyd was voiced by Jillian Michaels. However, after the release of The Lego Ninjago Movie and the subsequent changes in character designs in season 8, Lloyd was voiced by Sam Vincent. In the 2017 film, titled The Lego Ninjago Movie, Lloyd was voiced by Dave Franco.

Description 
Lloyd is recognisable by his green gi, the ninja outfit that he typically wears in the Ninjago series and across the Lego Ninjago franchise. The design of his gi changes multiple times in the series, but he is usually depicted wearing a hood and mask when in combat. He is typically portrayed using a katana as his signature weapon. When he is introduced in the first season of Ninjago: Masters of Spinjitzu, he appears as a young boy, with blonde hair in a bowl-cut style, wearing a black, hooded outfit. However, over the course of the series he is rapidly aged up to a young teenager with long, blonde, tousled hair.

In his first appearance, Lloyd is portrayed as a minor antagonist who makes childish attempts to perform evil deeds, such as robbing villagers of candy and pulling pranks. He is also depicted attempting to conquer Ninjago, but failing due to his immaturity. As the story develops, he is taken into the care of his uncle, Sensei Wu, and turned from the path of evil. Throughout subsequent seasons, Lloyd's character is developed from a mischievous child into a wise and skilled ninja. By the seventh season, titled Hands of Time, he is portrayed as a fully developed character, ready to take the role of master and eventual leader of the team. At the beginning of the eighth season, titled Sons of Garmadon, Lloyd is further developed into a late teen and appears visibly older, having longer hair and a lower voice. His eyes are green, reflecting his green elemental power, and typically glow in combat scenes. His character is also presented as more mature, and within the dialogue, he is often shown displaying wisdom beyond his years. From the eleventh season, Lloyd's character is consistently portrayed as a calm and confident team leader, able to make quick decisions when facing adversity.

Chronologically, Lloyd is the youngest member of the ninja team (although his age is not clearly defined) while the other ninja are described as "grown-up teenagers". In The Lego Ninjago Movie, Lloyd's age is stated to be 16.

Abilities
In the Ninjago series, Lloyd is described as an "Elemental Master", one of several characters who can manipulate an "element". In Lloyd's case, he is the Elemental Master of Energy, which gives him the ability to manipulate energy in various ways, such as shooting green energy blasts at his enemies, creating explosions of energy and creating an energy shield to protect his body from attack. These powers first begin to develop in the second season, Legacy of the Green Ninja. Lloyd's powers are shown to become progressively stronger, as he develops the ability to form balls of energy and shoot energy blasts. Towards the end of the second season, Lloyd's powers are depicted at their greatest strength when he reaches his true potential, becoming the Golden Ninja. He uses this "Golden Power" to destroy the Overlord, the main antagonist of the season, in an explosion of light. However, in the third season, titled Rebooted, Lloyd voluntarily gives up his Golden Power, leaving just his elemental energy powers remaining.

In early seasons, Lloyd's powers are shown to be connected to the elemental powers of the original four ninja. He is consistently portrayed as the strongest Elemental Master, which is explained by the fact that he can harness all of other ninja's elemental powers. Over the course of the series, Lloyd's elemental power is sometimes temporarily lost as a result of both internal and external forces to serve the storyline. This is particularly evident in the eighth season Sons of Garmadon and ninth season Hunted, in which Lloyd is shown to completely lose his elemental powers after losing a brutal fight with his father, Lord Garmadon. Like the other ninja, Lloyd also has the ability to use his elemental powers to summon an elemental vehicle or energy dragon at will.

In the first season, Lloyd is shown to have no experience in combat, but is subsequently trained by the ninja in the second season. As part of this combat training, Lloyd is shown to develop his skills in the art of "Spinjitzu", a fictional martial arts technique, in which the characters rotate rapidly to create a tornado of their elemental power and hit enemies in the process. When Lloyd is developed into a young teenager, he is shown to have acquired the physical skill and focus to become a confident and skilled warrior. In addition to these skills, the writers also depict Lloyd and the ninja repeatedly using Spinjitzu to form a "Tornado of Creation" to defeat enemies, which involves the characters combining their individual Spinjitzu tornadoes. In the fifth season titled Possession, a new skill called "Airjitzu" is introduced, which is similar to Spinjitzu, but allows the characters to levitate off the ground.

Appearances

Ninjago TV series 

From his first appearance in the television series in 2011, Lloyd's fictional family history is placed at the center of both the main storyline and the lore of the show. Significantly, he is positioned as the grandson of the First Spinjitzu Master, who is described as the legendary inventor of the show's fictional martial art of "Spinjitzu" and the creator of Ninjago. He is also the son of Lord Garmadon, the elder son of the First Spinjitzu Master, and Misako, an archaeologist. The series incorporates a fictional backstory relating how Lloyd's father was consumed by darkness and cast into another realm called the Underworld by Lloyd's uncle, Wu. These events are shown to have a major impact on Lloyd's character, who is presented growing up without knowing his father, but desiring to follow in his footsteps. In the first season, the prophecy of the Green Ninja is revealed, who, according to the lore of the show, is destined to rise above the other ninja and save Ninjago from a dark lord.

Lloyd makes his debut in the first season, Rise of the Snakes, as a mischievous child desiring to be an evil warlord like his father. The story portrays him attempting to prove himself by conquering Ninjago, but failing. This then leads to him being taken into the care of Master Wu. It is later revealed that Lloyd is destined to become the prophesied Green Ninja, which consequently results in an inevitable confrontation with his father. In the second season, titled Legacy of the Green Ninja, the story centers on the ninja training Lloyd to develop his fighting skills and learn the fictional martial art of Spinjitzu. Meanwhile, his father is shown plotting to conquer Ninjago through various devious plans. In the episode "Child's Play", Lloyd is magically aged up to an adolescent. The show illustrates his powers developing in strength until the season finale, which culminates in Lloyd unlocking his "Golden Power" and defeating the Overlord, an entity of pure evil.

In the third season, Rebooted, the Overlord returns as a digital entity without physical form. The story depicts him capturing Lloyd and draining him of most of his Golden Power. In the season finale, the Digital Overlord is ultimately defeated by a member of the ninja team named Zane, who is seemingly destroyed. In the final episode, the story shows how this loss results in the dissolution of the ninja team. However, in the following season, Lloyd is shown attempting to rebuild it. The fourth season, titled Tournament of Elements,  involves the ninja travelling to an island in search of Zane, whom they believe is alive on the island, and competing in season antagonist Master Chen's Tournament of Elements. After discovering Chen's true plan to conquer Ninjago, Lloyd and the ninja are shown making an alliance with several other Elemental Masters to fight against Chen and his army. The plot is resolved with Garmadon making the decision to sacrifice himself in order to save Ninjago, which is shown to leave Lloyd with feelings of loss for his father.

In the fifth season, titled Possession, events in the story show Lloyd being possessed by the spirit of an Elemental Master named Morro, with his body taking an evil form for the majority of the season. In subsequent seasons, the ninja are pitted against other villains, including an evil genie named Nadakhan in the sixth season, Skybound, and Krux and Acronix, the Elemental Masters of time, in the seventh season, Hands of Time. Although the writers show him initially struggling to gain the respect of the ninja, Lloyd eventually develops the confidence and maturity to become the permanent leader of the team.

In the eighth season, Sons of Garmadon, Lloyd is portrayed developing romantic feelings for a character named Princess Harumi, who is eventually revealed to be "The Quiet One", the leader of a criminal biker gang called the Sons of Garmadon. She resurrects Lord Garmadon in a ritual that only brings back his evil characteristics. This event is shown to have enormous impact on Lloyd, who decides to confront his father alone, but is nearly killed and loses his elemental powers. In the ninth season titled Hunted, Garmadon conquers Ninjago with a giant stone monster, forcing Lloyd to go into hiding. However, Lloyd finds his voice and broadcasts a message of hope to the people of Ninjago. The story culminates in Lloyd facing Garmadon once more and finally defeating him after learning to resist his attacks rather than fight back.

In the following seasons, Lloyd is portrayed leading the ninja to successfully defeat several other villains and their armies, including a demonic race called the Oni in the tenth season, March of the Oni, a snake queen named Aspheera in the eleventh season, Secrets of the Forbidden Spinjitzu, a sentient video game named Unagami in the twelfth season, Prime Empire, an evil Skull Sorcerer in the thirteenth season, Master of the Mountain, and an underwater tyrant named Prince Kalmaar in the fourteenth season, Seabound.

The Lego Ninjago Movie

Lloyd is the protagonist of The Lego Ninjago Movie, released in 2017. Although the plot is not directly related to the Ninjago television series, Lloyd retains his role as the Green Ninja and leader of the secret ninja force. The film focuses on Lloyd defending Ninjago City from his evil father, Lord Garmadon, who makes regular attempts to conquer Ninjago City with the help of his Shark Army. Lloyd is universally despised for being the son of an evil warlord, but the citizens of Ninjago City are unaware that he is the Green Ninja. Lloyd and the ninja fight Garmadon and his minions using their mechs, until Lloyd uses the "Ultimate Weapon" (a laser pointer) on Garmadon, which attracts a live-action cat named Meowthra, who starts to destroy the city. To put an end to the destruction, Lloyd and the ninja must go on a perilous journey to find the "Ultimate, Ultimate Weapon" with Garmadon in tow. On the journey, Lloyd spends time with his father and bonds with him in the process. At the end of the film, Lloyd reveals that he is the Green Ninja, having saved Ninjago City from Meowthra, and is reconciled with his father. He also learns that his green energy power means life and connects all living things in the way that he is connected to his family and the ninja.

Merchandise 

Lloyd and the ninja have been released numerous times in Lego minifigure form, as part of the Lego Ninjago playsets developed alongside the series. Since 2011, the Lego Ninjago themed sets have been released in waves each year to correspond with the Ninjago seasons. The playsets in each wave feature some of the main locations, vehicles, mechs, weapons and characters from the corresponding season, including Lloyd and the ninja dressed in their current gi designs.

Other media 

Lloyd appears alongside the other ninja characters in magazines, short films, video games, coloring books, graphic novels, children's books, and a theme park ride. In 2014, he also makes a cameo appearance in The Lego Movie. A 4D short animated film titled Lego Ninjago: Master of the 4th Dimension, was released in Legoland on January 12, 2018, featuring Lloyd and the ninja. The plot focuses on Master Wu teaching the ninja a lesson about the Scroll of the 4th Dimension, which affects gravity and organized matter. Lloyd and the ninja also appear in an interactive theme park ride called Lego Ninjago: The Ride at Legoland.

Various accompanying books to the Ninjago series have been produced featuring Lloyd and the ninja. A total of 12 graphic novels have been published, written by Greg Farshtey. Since the beginning of 2012, a Lego Ninjago magazine has been released in the UK and the Netherlands every month, containing a comic strip, facts, puzzles, posters, competitions and other activities.

Several mini-movies have been produced alongside the Ninjago television series, which include appearances from Lloyd and the ninja:

Pilot Episode Mini-movies - six short films that take place immediately after the pilot season, released in 2011Chen Mini-movies - five mini-movies that focus on Master Chen and his chair from Tournament of Elements, released in 2015Tall Tales - six mini-movies that focus on the Sky Pirates of Skybound, released in 2016Wu's Teas - a collection of 20 Ninjago shorts that focus on Master Wu's tea shop, released in 2017Happy Birthday To You! - a one-minute short, released on Netflix on September 14, 2017Ninjago: Decoded - a mini-series of ten episodes which takes place between Hands of Time and Sons of Garmadon, released on November 27, 2017Tales from the Monastery of Spinjitzu - six Ninjago: Legacy films from the Lego website, released December 19, 2018Prime Empire Original Shorts - six Ninjago shorts that provide additional background information about Prime Empire, released in 2020Ninjago: Reimagined - five shorts in different animations styles released in 2021 to celebrate the series' 10th anniversaryThe Virtues of Spinjitzu - six Ninjago shorts in which Master Wu teaches the six virtues of Spinjitzu, released in 2022

Lloyd appears as a playable character in a variety of video games and mobile games, including Lego Ninjago: Nindroids (2014), The Lego Movie Video Game, Lego Ninjago: Shadow of Ronin (2015), Lego Dimensions (2015), Lego Worlds (2017), The Lego Ninjago Movie Video Game (2017), Lego Brawls (2019) and Lego Legacy: Heroes Unboxed (2020).

Mascots of the character appeared at various events and at shopping centers across the UK in 2016 and 2017.

Reception 
Lloyd's turbulent relationship with his father, Lord Garmadon, received some positive comments among film critics following his appearance in The Lego Ninjago Movie. Movieguide noted that the movie has a "strong pro-family worldview", and that "the reconciliation between Lloyd and his father leads to the father’s redemption" and that "the movie promotes family reconciliation". Julian Roman of Movieweb also commented that "The Lego Ninjago Movie is essentially about a father and son reconnecting". On August 13, 2021, Graeme Virtue of The Guardian included Lloyd Garmadon on a list of "ten of the best ninjas in pop culture".

Influence and legacy 
Lloyd has become a widely recognizable character among the show's target audience, who are mainly primary-aged children and teenagers. His appearance as the protagonist in The Lego Ninjago Movie in 2017 introduced the character to a wider mainstream audience. Lloyd's popularity as a character has been maintained for over a decade, since his first appearance in 2011. This resulted in many primary-aged children growing up watching the character and taking their appreciation into adulthood.

The popularity of the character has been partly attributed to his relatability as a typical teenager with everyday problems. Christopher Stamp, Senior Designer at Lego, stated, "None of the characters are perfect, they are all flawed and I think that is something everyone can relate to". This relatability was also demonstrated in The Lego Ninjago Movie. Dave Franco, voice actor of Lloyd in the movie, commented "It’s particularly hard for Lloyd because, during the day, he's a tortured high school kid and everyone hates him because of the fact his dad is so awful. But then, at night, he becomes the Green Ninja and he protects everyone from Garmadon, yet he doesn't get any of the glory because no one knows he's the Green Ninja".

Lloyd's role as the protagonist has been influential in terms of the messaging that has come out of the show and the movie. Plugged In noted that Lloyd's story is an exploration of familial bonds and focuses on the character's longing for a deeper father-son connection. "As the story unfolds, we witness the transforming power of a loving relationship as well as the difference forgiveness and communication can make in a broken one". The Ninjago series intentionally tried to teach children messages about the importance of inclusivity, friendship, confidence, and staying true to oneself, in which Lloyd embodies a positive role model to children. Michael Svane Knap remarked that "Some have grown up with Lego Ninjago and are now expressing their gratitude and telling us how they have learned lifelong skills".

See also
 Lego Ninjago
 Ninjago (TV series)
 List of Ninjago episodes
 List of Ninjago characters
 The Lego Ninjago Movie
 The Lego Ninjago Movie (Lego theme)
 The Lego Ninjago Movie Video Game

References

Primary

Secondary

Lego Ninjago
Fictional ninja
Child superheroes
Fictional characters with energy-manipulation abilities
Fictional male martial artists
Fictional swordfighters
Male characters in animated series
Animated human characters
Child characters in animated television series
Television characters introduced in 2011
Teenage superheroes
Teenage characters in animated films
Teenage characters in television
Fictional half-demons